Bayraktar Akıncı (Raider lit. "Akinji") is a high-altitude long-endurance (HALE) unmanned combat aerial vehicle (UCAV) being manufactured by the Turkish defence company Baykar. The first three units entered service with the Turkish Armed Forces on 29 August 2021.

The aircraft has a 5.5+ tons of maximum takeoff weight (MTOW) of which 1350+ kg is composed of payload. Akıncı is equipped with two turboprop engines which has two different types of thrust capabilities as 450 or 750 hp. Akinci is equipped with electronic support and countermeasure systems, dual satellite communication systems, air-to-air radar, collision avoidance radar and national advanced synthetic aperture radar.

Development 

With the preliminary design phase completed in June 2019, Akıncı started engine ground run in August 2019 with a Ukrainian turboprop engine Ivchenko-Progress AI-450C. First engine test was accomplished on September 1, 2019. Following the completion of other technical tests, the aircraft was moved to the Turkish Army's Çorlu Airfield Command. The UCAV made its maiden flight with automatic taxiing, take-off, 16-minute flight and successful landing on December 6, 2019.

Akıncı has  internal and  external payload capacity, combining the overall combat load to max. . Powered by two  or  turboprop engines, large  wingspan ensures 5.5 tons of maximum takeoff weight. Akıncı will be the first UAV capable of launching an air launched cruise missile.

First pictures of the UAV hit media reports in June 2018 and it was unveiled to the public during the Teknofest Aviation, Space and Technology Festival in September 2019.

On 22 April 2021, Bayraktar Akıncı UCAV has successfully conducted its first firing tests. During the test Akıncı was equipped with three different variants of the indigenously developed smart ammunitions, MAM-L, MAM-C and MAM-T. The test has also been the first public appearance of the Roketsan's newest smart ammunition MAM-T. From July 6 to 7, the aircraft completed a test flight of 25 hours and 45 minutes, flying 7507 km and reaching an altitude of 38,039 feet or 11,594 meters. On August 29, 2021, Akinci was added to the inventory of Turkish armed forces.

Operational History 
Akıncı has been used first in Pençe-Kilit Operations which held by Turkish military to dissolve PKK positions such as shelters and caves in Northern Iraq.

A total of 9 Turkish Bayraktar Akinci  UAVs successfully flew over 1551 hours in the earthquake zone of the 2023 Turkey-Syria earthquake.
The drones have been instrumental in providing continuous updates and data to the crisis response team for damage detection, search and rescue support, along with coordination activities.

Avionics and radar 

The Akinci drone is equipped with an indigenously manufactured active electronically scanned array (AESA) radar, a SAR/GMTI radar, a surveillance system, electronic warfare, and signal intelligence suite (SIGINT), and SATCOM allowing Akinci to become an UCAV as well as ISTAR+C3 asset for Turkish military.

Timeline 

 On 6 December 2019, Bayraktar Akıncı conducted its maiden flight.
 On 10 January 2020, Bayraktar Akıncı prototype 1 conducted its second flight and passed over 6000 ft.
 On 13 August 2020, Bayraktar Akıncı prototype 2 conducted its maiden flights.
 On 19 August 2020, Bayraktar Akıncı prototype 2 conducted its medium altitude system integration flight tests.
 On 22 August 2020, Bayraktar Akıncı prototype 1 passed over 30.000 ft during a flight test.
 On 5 September 2020, Bayraktar Akıncı prototype 2 conducted its high altitude and high speed flight tests.
 On 8–9 September 2020, Critical Design Review was conducted for Bayraktar Akıncı UCAV platform.
 On 11 September 2020, Bayraktar Akıncı prototype 2 conducted its medium altitude system integration flight tests.
 On 3 October 2020, Bayraktar Akıncı prototype 2 conducted the asymmetric thrust tests.
 On 13 March 2021, Bayraktar Akıncı prototype 2 conducted its advanced system integration flight tests.
 On 27 March 2021, Bayraktar Akıncı prototype 3 conducted its maiden flight.
 On 10 April 2021, Bayraktar Akıncı prototype 3 conducted its medium altitude system integration flight tests.
 On 13 April 2021, Bayraktar Akıncı prototype 3 conducted its high altitude and high speed flight tests.
 On 22 April 2021, Bayraktar Akıncı conducted its first firing tests.
 On 19 May 2021, the first serial produced Bayraktar Akıncı conducted its maiden flight
 On 10 July 2021, Bayraktar Akıncı conducted a 13 hours and 24 minute long flight with 1360 kg payload. During the flight Akıncı was equipped with the NEB bunker buster bomb developed by TUBITAK SAGE. Marking the heaviest bomb ever carried by an UCAV
 On 29 August 2021, the first three units were delivered to the Turkish Armed Forces
 On 24 December 2021, two units were delivered to the Turkish Armed Forces
 On 23 January 2022, first export agreement of Bayraktar Akıncı was announced
 On 13 February 2022, Bayraktar Akıncı conducted its first combat mission
 On 2 March 2022, second export agreement of Bayraktar Akıncı was announced
 On 2 March 2022, the Baykar announced that the Bayraktar AKINCI-B version with twin  engines completed its maiden flight 
 On 21 May 2022, the Bayraktar AKINCI crossed 3 countries (Turkey, Georgia, Azerbaijan), flying approximately 2000 km.
 On 14 June 2022, the Bayraktar AKINCI UCAV (Unmanned Combat Aerial Vehicle) has successfully completed its first firing test from 30 kilometers away with the KGK-SIHA-82 (Winged Guidance Kit) ammunition.
 On 21 June 2022, the Bayraktar AKINCI B Variant took off to carry out endurance, high altitude and high speed tests, The B Variant rose to an altitude of  within the scope of the test, returned to Bayraktar AKINCI Flight, Training and Test Center at Çorlu Airport Command after 20 hours and 23 minutes of flight.
 On 1 July 2022, the Bayraktar AKINCI carried out a test firing with the LGK-82 (Laser Guidance Kit), developed by ASELSAN, Flying with an altitude of 30 thousand feet, the target was laser-marked by Bayraktar TB2 SİHA, The LGK-82 was Launched from UAV for the first time.
 On 3 August 2022, three units were delivered to the Turkish Air Force
 On 24 August 2022, three additional units were delivered to the Turkish Armed Forces, bringing the number of drones operated by Turkey to 12

Operators
The Bayraktar Akıncı has been sold to 4 countries as of October 2022.

Current operators 

 Turkish Land Forces – 8 operational
 Turkish Air Force – 6 operational
 MIT Presidency - 1 operational

Future operators 

 Azerbaijan Air Force

 Pakistan Air Force – Plan to operate after 2023

 Kyrgyz Air Force

Potential operators 

 Indonesian National Armed Forces

Specifications

See also
 Baykar Bayraktar Mini UAV
 Baykar Bayraktar TB1
 Baykar Bayraktar TB2
 Baykar Bayraktar TB3
 Baykar Bayraktar Kızılelma
 TAI Anka
 TAI Aksungur

References

Unmanned military aircraft of Turkey
Twin-boom aircraft
High-wing aircraft
Twin-turboprop tractor aircraft
Medium-altitude long-endurance unmanned aerial vehicles
Aircraft first flown in 2019
Unmanned aerial vehicles of Turkey